Christopher Paul Persaud-Jagdhar (born 27 December 1967), known professionally as C. J. Wildheart is an English musician of Guyanese and Seychellois descent. He is a solo artist and also a founding member of the UK rock band The Wildhearts.

He was born in Colchester, and his early childhood was spent living in various military bases in Malaysia and Europe whilst his father and mother served in the British army. The family eventually moved back to the UK during his teens.

Early bands 
CJ was involved with several local bands including Medusa, before achieving his first notable success in the late 1980s as the guitarist for London-based hair rockers Tattooed Love Boys. The band released their debut album Bleeding Hearts and Needle Marks in 1988 before splitting up shortly afterwards.

The Wildhearts 
In 1989 CJ formed The Wildhearts with ex-The Quireboys guitarist Ginger (David Walls). Despite being plagued by widely reported drug and alcohol problems, the band enjoyed considerable mainstream success during the early 1990s, including two UK top 20 hits. In 1994, at their commercial peak, CJ was unexpectedly kicked out during the recording of the P.H.U.Q. album due to personal differences between himself and Ginger.

Interim bands 
CJ joined former Grip frontman Willie Dowling to form Honeycrack in 1995 who were signed to Epic Records. The band released one album Prozaic in 1996 which charted at number 34 in the UK. Honeycrack toured with the likes of Alanis Morissette, Weezer, and Skunk Anansie throughout 1995 and 1996 as well as appearances at the Phoenix Festival and T in The Park.  The band broke away from Epic in late 1996 and eventually disbanded. In 1998 CJ formed The Jellys with ex-Wildhearts drummer Stidi and former Wolfsbane bass player Jeff Hately. They released two studio albums and one live album between 1998 and 2001.

Solo career 
CJ released his first solo album Thirteen in 2007 under the moniker CJ & The Satellites. The album was supported with live dates in the UK and China but were quickly put on hiatus due to the reformation of The Wildhearts in 2009. The album was reissued on CD and vinyl in 2014. 

Also in 2014, CJ released the album Mable, which was funded through the Pledgemusic platform and was named after his favourite chicken. Mable reached number 23 in the UK album chart; it also reached number 2 in the Official UK Rock Chart and number 2 in the Independent Album Breakers Chart, CJ's highest chart positions as a solo artist. Reviews were very positive across the board. Uber Rock commented "Not many albums will touch 'Mable' this year". The albums scored highly in end of year poll lists including number 2 the Pure Rawk album of the year list, number 6 in the Uber Rock album of the year list, and number 1 in the Rock 'n' Roll Geek Show album of the year list. On 6 March 2015 Mable received the Album of The Year award at the Pure Rawk Awards held in London.

CJ released two more albums funded by pledge campaigns: Robot in 2015 and Blood in 2017. He has also launched his own brand of hot sauce called "Devilspit".

Return to The Wildhearts 
The Jellys disbanded when CJ and Stidi both re-joined The Wildhearts in 2001 and recorded The Wildhearts Must Be Destroyed album. CJ would remain a permanent fixture in the band recording the eponymous album The Wildhearts in 2007 and Chutzpah! in 2009. The Wildhearts then went on hiatus before releasing their first new album in a decade, Renaissance Men, in 2019, followed by 21st Century Love Songs in 2021.

Discography 
EPs
 Mondo Akimbo a-Go-Go - The Wildhearts (Bronze, 1992)
 Don't Be Happy... Just Worry - The Wildhearts (East West, 1992)
 Fishing For Luckies - The Wildhearts (East West, 1994)

Albums
 Bleeding Hearts and Needle Marks - The Tattooed Love Boys (1989)
 Earth Vs The Wildhearts - The Wildhearts (East West, 1993)
 P.H.U.Q. - The Wildhearts (East West, 1995)
 Prozaic - Honeycrack (Epic 1996)
 Welcome to Our World - The Jellys (Mir, 1998)
 Doctored for Supersound - The Jellys (2000)
 Disco Suxx - The Mau-Maus (2001)
 The Wildhearts Must Be Destroyed - The Wildhearts (Gut, 2003)
 The Wildhearts Strike Back (live) - The Wildhearts (Gut, 2004)
 The Wildhearts - The Wildhearts (Cargo, 2007)
 Thirteen - C.J & The Satellites (Cargo, 2007)
 Stop Us If You've Heard This One Before, Vol 1. - The Wildhearts (2008)
 ¡Chutzpah! - The Wildhearts (2009)
¡Chutzpah! Jnr. - The Wildhearts (2010)
 Mable - CJ Wildheart (Devilspit Records, 2014)
 Robot - CJ Wildheart (Devilspit Records, 2015)
 Blood - CJ Wildheart (Devilspit Records, 2017)
Renaissance Men - The Wildhearts (2019)
Diagnosis - The Wildhearts (2020)

DVDs
Live at The Castle - The Wildhearts (Secret, 2005)
In the Studio - The Wildhearts (Round, 2008)
Live at the Bush - The Wildhearts (2010)

References

External links
Interview with CJ in Glasgow, Scotland, 2009
Interview with CJ

Living people

1967 births

English rock guitarists
English male guitarists
The Wildhearts members
Musicians from Essex
People from Colchester